The following lists events that happened during 1828 in Chile.

Incumbents
President of Chile: Francisco Antonio Pinto.

Events

August
 9 August: The Chilean Constitution is promulgated.

Births
 11 January - Miguel Luis Amunátegui (d. 1888)

Deaths
 date unknown - Luis de la Cruz (b. 1768)
 2 July - Martín Calvo Encalada (b. 1756)
 10 November - Francisco Antonio Pérez (b. 1764)

References 

1820s in Chile
Chile
Chile